Ambrosiinae is a subtribe of flowering plants in the tribe Heliantheae, and is endemic to the Americas.

Genera
Genera recognized by the Global Compositae Database as of November 2022:

Ambrosia 
Dicoria 
Euphrosyne 
Hedosyne 
Iva 
Parthenice 
Parthenium 
Xanthium

References

Heliantheae
Plants described in 1830
Plant subtribes